Patrol 03 is a Canadian and French animated television series that aired in 1998 and was broadcast on Teletoon in Canada and France 3 in France.

Plot
The show centers around a trio of animal police officers called Shorty, Wilfred and Carmen; who solve crimes in the city of Los Diablos as "Patrol 03" - most of the police force considers them a joke and looks them down due to the minor assignments they get and their broken-down patrol car. The main villains of the show are the power-hungry Police Chief Pamela Bondani, who wants to become the town's mayor, and her mole assistant Professor Molo. The two are always trying to take over the city using various schemes while Bondani assigns Patrol 03 with various meaningless tasks to keep them out of the way.

Characters
 Shorty (voiced by: Sébastien Desjours (original), Bruce Dinsmore (dubbed)) a basset hound, is the de facto leader of the trio. His body is so elastic that it can even stretch to a certain degree.
 Wilfred (voiced by: Patrick Floersheim (original), Rick Jones (dubbed))  a large rat, serves as the brawn of the trio. because of his unusually large size and strength.
 Carmen (voiced by: Laurence Saquet (original), Sonja Ball (dubbed)) a paraplegic blue fox that has a wheelchair containing gadgets, which help the trio in their adventures.
 Police Chief Pamela Bondani (voiced by: Françoise Pavy (original), Jennifer Seguin (dubbed))  a cat, is the corrupt head of the police department. The trio are aware of her corrupt nature but pretend not to know as to avoid blowing their cover so they can get enough evidence to bring her to justice.
 Lieutenant Rhino (voiced by: Alain Flick (original), Terrence Scammell (dubbed)) a rhinoceros, is Pamela's second in command, who has a tendency to laugh hard enough to cause an earth tremor. He is very naive and is unaware of his chief's malevolent nature. 
 Alfredo a blood hound, is the prison warden of the security compound.
 Professor Molo (voiced by: Vincent Violette (original), Arthur Holden (dubbed)) a mole, is an ex convict, mad scientist and genius and Pamela's partner in crime who assist her on her nefarious schemes to take over the city, usually by creating some sort of monster or gadget.
 Mayor Alexander Walrus (voiced by: Jean-François Kopf (original), Walter Massey (dubbed)) is mayor of the city of Los Diablos and the one who trained Patrol 03 personally. Patrol 03 acts as the mayor's personal spies and informants on what the Police Chief is doing and gather enough evidence to put her away for good. The mayor is aware of Pamela's corruption and had Patrol 03 sent to the station to not only keep an eye on her but to ensure the city's well-being as they are the only honest police officers who does the actual work.
 Snap (voiced by: Mathieu Buscatto (original), A.J. Henderson (dubbed)) a crocodile, is the city mechanic. He provides the trio the gadgets and inventions they need on their adventures against crime. He has a crush on Carmen.

Episodes

Season 1

Season 2

External links

1990s French animated television series
1998 French television series debuts
1998 French television series endings
French children's animated comedy television series
Television series by Cookie Jar Entertainment
Teletoon original programming
Television series by DHX Media